Ellen Wilkinson High School was housed, until it closed in 2000, in a Grade II* listed building in Ardwick, Manchester, England, designed in 1879–80 by the prolific Manchester architect Thomas Worthington. Formerly known as Nicholls Hospital, the building was funded by Benjamin Nicholls as a memorial to his son, John Ashton Nicholls. Nicholls commissioned Worthington to prepare designs in 1867, with instructions that building was only to commence after his own death.  It was Worthington's last significant commission in the city. The original usage was as an orphanage; the Ashton family gave over £100,000 to its construction and endowment.

The style is flamboyant Flemish Gothic in red brick with sandstone dressings and steeply-pitched slate roofs. The main range is double-pile with eleven bays and a massive central tower, which shows clear similarities to that of Worthington's City Police Courts at Minshull Street.  The tower was originally embellished by Worthington's trade-mark animal carving but the majority were removed in the 20th century.

From 1952 to 1967 the building was used as the Nicholls Secondary Boys School. The school later amalgamated with Ardwick High School.  Initially the school was known as Nicholls Ardwick High School but was later renamed in honour of Ellen Wilkinson, socialist, feminist and first female Minister for Education, who was born in Ardwick. The school achieved renown because of its heavy emphasis on the arts thereby anticipating 'specialist school' status by some decades. In 2000 the building changed use again when Ellen Wilkinson High School was merged into Cedar Mount High School, the old hospital becoming Nicholls Campus of Manchester City College.

See also

Grade II* listed buildings in Greater Manchester
Listed buildings in Manchester-M12

References

Wilkinson High School
Wilkinson High School
Towers in Greater Manchester
Grade II* listed buildings in Manchester
Wilkinson High School
Wilkinson High School
Wilkinson High School
1880 establishments in England
2000 disestablishments in England
Gothic Revival architecture in Greater Manchester
Wilkinson High School